Grayson Hart (born 19 June 1988 in Kaitaia, New Zealand) is a professional rugby union player for Bedford Blues.  He previously played for Glasgow Warriors and Edinburgh Rugby in the Pro12 and the Blues and the NSW Waratahs in Super Rugby. Also Ealing Trailfinders and London Scottish in the RFU Championship. His usual position is Scrum-half.

Early years
Hart grew up in the Auckland suburb of Mt Roskill where he excelled in many sports while attending Dilworth School. He then moved to Mt Roskill Grammar School for the last two years of secondary school. He was a member of Auckland representative rugby sides from under-14 through to under-16.

Playing career
Known as a quick and skilled scrum-half with a great pass who isn't shy when it comes to the physical aspects of the game, Grayson Hart has played Super Rugby for the Blues and NSW Waratahs as well as NPC Rugby for Auckland and North Harbour. In the Northern Hemisphere he has played for Edinburgh Rugby and is currently a member of Glasgow Warriors and has been capped internationally by Scotland.

2007
Grayson made his debut for Auckland in the 2007 Air New Zealand Cup as a 19-year-old and made 13 appearances for a team that went undefeated during the season, won the Air New Zealand Cup and reclaimed the Ranfurly Shield from Canterbury.

2008
Hart was a key member of the New Zealand under-20 team which won the inaugural IRB Junior World Championship in 2008 in Wales, scoring a try against Ireland in the process. At the end of 2008 he played in an All Blacks practice match against the New Zealand Barbarians side. He would again suit up for Auckland in the Air New Zealand Cup where he shared time at scrum-half with Taniela Moa.

2009
Hart made his Super Rugby debut for the Blues against the Bulls in Round 2 of 2009, he then went on to play seven Super 14 matches that season. At 20 years old, he is the youngest scrum-half ever to play for the Blues at Super Rugby level. Again played for Auckland at ITM Cup level.

2010
He was again part of the Blues Wider Training Group but with the signing of more experienced players at the scrum-half position Grayson did not play in any Super Rugby matches. Hart spent the 2010 season on loan to North Harbour for the ITM Cup.

2011
With opportunities in New Zealand limited, Hart set off to Australia where he signed with Southern Districts Rugby Club in Sydney's Shute Shield competition and was immediately signed to the NSW Waratahs academy. He impressed the NSW coaching staff with his play for Souths and signed on for the 2012 Super Rugby season.

2012
In 2012 Hart trained with the Waratahs, as a member of the Extended Playing Group. He also played for Southern Districts in the Shute Shield, where his form at scrum-half helped convince Waratahs selectors him to partner with flyhalf with Bernard Foley. Hart made his debut for the Waratahs in the starting lineup in Round 20 against the Brumbies. Waratahs wing Drew Mitchell wrote a glowing column in the Herald Sun about Grayson's contribution. Following this performance Hart was retained as the starter for the Waratahs in the team's final game of the season against the playoff bound Reds. Hart held his own in the face of world class competition, in the form of scrum-half Will Genia.

Grayson remained a member of the Waratahs squad in 2013.

2013–2015
After another season at the Tahs, Hart moved to Edinburgh, in the Pro12 tournament along with team mate Oliver Atkins. He made his debut for Edinburgh in a RaboPro12 game against Ulster at Ravenhill on 22 November, coming on as a substitute and scoring a try in the process. Hart was rewarded with his first start for Edinburgh in a Heineken Cup match against Gloucester at Kingsholm Stadium and was at the forefront of a gallant Edinburgh effort, he played 80 minutes and led the team around the park remarkably for an upset win which revived their European campaign. Hart would go on to make 24 appearances for Edinburgh over the next two seasons, making 13 starts and scoring five tries.

2015-2018

In March 2015, Grayson Hart signed a two-year deal with Scottish rivals Glasgow Warriors, where he made the short trip down the M8 to compete for a starting place on Gregor Townsend's league leading squad.

Over two seasons with the Warriors, Grayson Hart made 32 appearances in the Pro12 and European Rugby Champions CUp, including 11 starts. When not in use for the Warriors, Hart played for the Glasgow Hawks in the Scottish Premiership.

In 2017, Hart joined the Ealing Trailfinders. He joined Aviva Premiership side Worcester Warriors for the final few weeks of the 2017-2018 season.

2018-

London Scottish signed Hart in May 2018 and he will join the club for the 2018/19 season.

2019

Bedford Blues signed the scrum-half in March 2019 and will be heading to Goldington Road for the 2019/20 season

International career

New Zealand Under 20

Hart played for the New Zealand under-20 side in the 2008 IRB Junior World Championship where he kept current All Blacks scrum-half Aaron Smith on the bench throughout the tournament. Also part of the 2008 World Champion New Zealand under-20 side were current All Blacks, Zac Guildford, Sam Whitelock as well as Wallabies flyhalf Mike Harris.

Scotland

He is eligible to play internationally for Scotland through his maternal Grandmother who was born in Glasgow.

On the back of some strong club form Grayson Hart was selected for Scotland A to face England Saxons in January 2014.

Grayson Hart made his test debut for Scotland after coming on as a substitute in a win over Canada on 14 June at BMO Field in Toronto. He went on to make a total of three appearances for Scotland on their Summer Tour.

2017

Hart was selected to join the Scotland sevens team for the Hong Kong 7s and the Singapore 7s, he went on to become a key contributor in their march to the London Sevens title in 2017, setting up the match winning try in the quarterfinal upset against his birth country New Zealand.

Honours

 2007: Air New Zealand Cup winner with Auckland
 2007: Ranfurly Shield winner with Auckland
 2008: IRB Junior World Championship winner with New Zealand U20
 2015: European Rugby Challenge Cup Runners-up with Edinburgh
 2016: '''2017 London Sevens Cup Champions with Scotland national rugby sevens team

Notes

References

External links
profile at Glasgow Warriors website

1988 births
Living people
New Zealand rugby union players
Scotland international rugby union players
Auckland rugby union players
North Harbour rugby union players
New South Wales Waratahs players
Blues (Super Rugby) players
Edinburgh Rugby players
Glasgow Warriors players
Rugby union scrum-halves
Glasgow Hawks players
Scotland 'A' international rugby union players
Ealing Trailfinders Rugby Club players
New Zealand expatriate sportspeople in Scotland
People educated at Dilworth School
People educated at Mount Roskill Grammar School
People from Kaitaia